Tony Holiday (born Rolf Peter Knigge; 24 February 1951 – 14 February 1990) was a German pop and schlager singer and songwriter.

Career
Knigge was born in Hamburg. He began his career initially as a textile businessman and fashion designer. In 1974, he received a record contract with Hans Bertram, who rechristened him "Tony Holiday". His first two singles met with little success. Holiday's breakthrough came in 1977 with the German recording of Italian singer Raffaella Carrà's 1976 single "A far l'amore comincia tu", retitled "Tanze Samba mit Mir" ("Dance the Samba With Me"). The song quickly became a hit in both Germany and Austria, peaking at No. 4 on the German music charts and reaching the Top 20 on the Austrian music charts.

In 1979, he participated with the title "Zuviel Tequila, zuviel schöne Mädchen" ("Too Much Tequila, Too Many Beautiful Girls") in the German finals for the Eurovision Song Contest and the song finished in ninth place.

Between 1975 and 1984, Holiday performed 11 times on the popular German music television program ZDF-Hitparade.

In 1980, Holiday scored a second European hit with "Nie mehr allein sein" which reached the number 15 on the German music charts. The song was a reworking of "Sun of Jamaica" by the German band Goombay Dance Band. Holiday subsequently hosted several music programs on television and released several more singles throughout the 1980s.

Death and legacy
Holiday was gay, but did not publicly acknowledge his homosexuality. He died on Valentine's Day, 1990 of an AIDS-related illness in Lausanne, aged 38, just ten days shy of his 39th birthday.

In 2000, Tony Holiday's single "Tanze Samba mit Mir" was prominently featured in the Teddy Award-winning François Ozon directed film Gouttes d'eau sur pierres brûlantes (Water Drops on Burning Rocks), an adaptation of the play Tropfen auf heiße Steine by German filmmaker and dramatist Rainer Werner Fassbinder.

Discography

References

1951 births
1990 deaths
20th-century German male singers
AIDS-related deaths in Switzerland
German pop singers
German male songwriters
Schlager musicians
German LGBT songwriters
German gay musicians
German LGBT singers
Gay songwriters
Musicians from Hamburg
Gay singers
German expatriates in Switzerland
20th-century German LGBT people